The Northern Ontario Curling Association (NOCA) Men's Provincial Championship, also known as the Northern Ontario Tankard is the Northern Ontario provincial championship for men's curling. The winner represents Team Northern Ontario annually at the Tim Hortons Brier. Northern Ontario has been represented at the Brier since 1927 despite not actually being a province.

Winners

Notes

References

Northern Ontario Curling Association: Champions 

The Brier provincial tournaments
Recurring sporting events established in 1927
Curling in Northern Ontario